Murad Velshi (born April 4, 1935) is a former politician in Ontario, Canada. He was a Liberal member of the Legislative Assembly of Ontario from 1987 to 1990. He represented the riding of Don Mills in Toronto.

Background
Velshi was born and raised in Pretoria, South Africa. He was a master baker and entrepreneur before relocating to Kenya where he operated a real-estate company.  After moving to Canada in 1971, he established a chain of travel agencies in Toronto and Vancouver. He served as president of the Flemingdon Health Centre and President of North York Red Cross.

His son, Ali Velshi, was a senior business correspondent and news anchor for CNN. After leaving CNN, Ali Velshi went to Al Jazeera America in 2013 and left in April 2016. Ali Velshi joined MSNBC in October 2016 where he is a news anchor for MSNBC Live and a co-anchor for the show Velshi & Ruhle.

Politics
He ran for a seat in the Ontario legislature in the 1981 provincial election and finished a distant second in the riding of Don Mills against Progressive Conservative incumbent Dennis Timbrell.  When Timbrell retired before the 1987 election, he ran again this time defeating his closest opponent by more than 2,000 votes. He served for a year as Parliamentary assistant to the Minister of Citizenship and Immigration.

The Liberals were defeated in the Ontario general election in 1990 and Velshi lost his seat to Margery Ward of the New Democratic Party of Ontario by 1,004 votes.  He attempted to regain the seat in a by-election held on April 1, 1993, but finished a weak second against Progressive Conservative candidate David Johnson.

References

External links

1935 births
Canadian Ismailis
Canadian politicians of Indian descent
Ontario Liberal Party MPPs
Living people
People from Pretoria
South African people of Indian descent
South African emigrants to Canada
Canadian people of Gujarati descent
Khoja Ismailism
South African people of Gujarati descent